Ángel R. Cabada is a municipality in the Mexican state of Veracruz. It is located about 207 km southeast from the state capital Xalapa, and is in the Papaloapan River region between Lerdo de Tejada and San Andrés Tuxtla on the Federal Highway. The municipality of Ángel R. Cabada is bordered to the north by the Gulf of Mexico, to the south by Santiago Tuxtla, and to the west by Saltabarranca and Lerdo de Tejada.

The municipality produces maize and beans.

References

External links 
 Map of Ángel R. Cabada municipality by the Veracruz State Office of Information for Sustainable Rural Development (Oeidrus). 
 Ángel R. Cabada, Veracruz 
 Municipal Official Site 

Municipalities of Veracruz